Isfahan Sepehr College ( is a College in Isfahan, Iran. It opened in January 2005. At present, the institution offers associate degrees in architecture, painting,theater,visual arts (graphic), and undergraduate degrees in architecture, painting,theater, graphics, film direction, and scriptwriting.

See also
 Isfahan Sepehr College in Wikipedia Persian

References

External links
Sepehr.ac.ir, Official Website
Facebook.com, Facebook Page

Universities in Iran
University of Isfahan
Buildings and structures in Isfahan
Universities in Isfahan Province